Maroussi Saint Thomas Indoor Hall, or Maroussi Agios Thomas Indoor Hall (alternate spelling: Marousi), is an indoor sporting arena that is located in the city of Athens in Maroussi area, Greece. The arena is primarily used to host basketball games. The indoor hall is owned by the municipality of Maroussi. The seating capacity of the indoor basketball arena is 1,700 people.

History
The arena was opened in the year 1998, when the Greek basketball club, Maroussi, was most recently promoted to the top-tier level Greek Basket League. It has been the home arena of Maroussi since then. The arena was renovated in 2017.

References

External links
Information on the stadium on Stadia.gr

Basketball venues in Greece
Indoor arenas in Greece
Marousi